Word Up! Magazine is a popular teen entertainment magazine created by founding editor-in-chief Gerrie Summers, the first of several Black teen magazines to be published by Word Up! Publications. The magazine debuted in August 1987.

Word Up! stood out from other publications of its kind due to its emphasis on hip-hop music and rap artists, including artists that had not yet made it into the mainstream. Word Up! preceded, inspired and influenced an influx of hip-hop/rap magazines.

On January 23, 2023, Fox News re-aired reporter G. Keith Alexander's What’s Hot New York entertainment segment for WNYW’s weekly television program, The McCreary Report as the opening episode of the network's 50 Years of Hip-Hop tribute series. Said Alexander: “Word Up distinguishes itself from most teen magazines by not talking down to its readers by focussing on more substantial topics and interests of its 14-30 age group.”

Essays by Word Up! readers became the heart of the book Stop The Violence: Overcoming Self-Destruction (1990) by the National Urban League and Nelson George, and an integral part of the Stop The Violence movement.

Kate Ferguson, editor-in-chief of sister publication Rap Masters, took on the role as EIC when Summers left to pursue freelance opportunities, and remained editor until 1995. The final issue appeared in April 2012.

The magazine was name-checked by The Notorious B.I.G. in his 1994 hit song "Juicy": "It was all a dream; I used to read Word Up! magazine."

References

African-American magazines
Entertainment magazines published in the United States
Monthly magazines published in the United States
Music magazines published in the United States
Defunct magazines published in the United States
Hip hop magazines
Magazines with year of establishment missing
Magazines disestablished in 2012
Magazines published in New Jersey
Teen magazines